Tabernaemontana odoratissima is a species of plant in the family Apocynaceae. It is found in Zaïre, Rwanda, Uganda, and Tanzania.

References

odoratissima